The thin sand-eel (Yirrkala tenuis) is an eel in the family Ophichthidae (worm/snake eels). It was described by Albert Günther in 1870, originally under the genus Ophichthys. It is a tropical, marine and freshwater eel which is known from the western Indian Ocean, including the Red Sea, South Africa, Mauritius and Réunion.

References

Ophichthidae
Fish described in 1870
Taxa named by Albert Günther